Eva Maria Bulling-Schröter (born 22 February 1956) is a German politician and member of German Left party.

Party 
Bulling Schröter was born in Ingolstadt, Bavaria. She had been a Member of the DKP since 1974 before she joined the PDS in 1990 which merged into Die Linke. Since 2000, she is a spokesperson of her party in Bavaria.

External links 

 
 Biography at the German Parliament
 Website on the parliamentary group Die Linke

1956 births
Living people
People from Ingolstadt
German Communist Party politicians
Party of Democratic Socialism (Germany) politicians
Members of the Bundestag for Bavaria
Female members of the Bundestag
21st-century German women politicians
Members of the Bundestag 2013–2017
Members of the Bundestag 2009–2013
Members of the Bundestag 2005–2009
Members of the Bundestag 1998–2002
Members of the Bundestag 1994–1998
Members of the Bundestag for The Left
Works councillors
20th-century German women